Snow White, Blood Red is the first book in a series of collections of re-told fairy tales edited by Ellen Datlow and Terri Windling.

Contents

 Introduction: White as Snow: Fairy Tales and Fantasy -- Terri Windling
 Red as Blood: Fairy Tales and Horror -- Ellen Datlow
 Like a Red, Red Rose -- Susan Wade
 The Moon Is Drowning While I Sleep (Newford) -- Charles de Lint
 The Frog Prince -- Gahan Wilson
 Stalking Beans -- Nancy Kress
 Snow-Drop -- Tanith Lee
 Little Red -- Wendy Wheeler
 I Shall Do Thee Mischief in the Wood -- Kathe Koja
 The Root of the Matter -- Gregory Frost
 The Princess in the Tower -- Elizabeth A. Lynn
 Persimmon -- Harvey Jacobs
 Little Poucet -- Steve Rasnic Tem
 The Changelings -- Melanie Tem
 The Springfield Swans -- Caroline Stevermer & Ryan Edmonds
 Troll Bridge -- Neil Gaiman
 A Sound, Like Angels Singing -- Leonard Rysdyk
 Puss -- Esther M. Friesner
 The Glass Casket -- Jack Dann
 Knives -- Jane Yolen
 The Snow Queen -- Patricia A. McKillip
 Breadcrumbs and Stones -- Lisa Goldstein
 Recommended Reading · Misc. Material

References

External links
Ellen Datlow's Bibliography
Reviews and Ratings at GoodReads.com

1993 anthologies
Fantasy anthologies
Horror anthologies
Collections of fairy tales
William Morrow and Company books